Shamboor  is a village in Bantwal Taluk, Dakshina Kannada district, Karnataka, India. It is located 5 km from a small city called Panemangalore to the East.

Education 

List of schools

Higher Primary School Shamboor
Shamboor High School

Religious Places 

Sacred Heart Of Jesus Church.
Location: This Church is situated at a distance of 37 km from Mangalore, 6 km from Panemangalore and is surrounded by Borimar, Mogarnad, Bantwal, Modankaup and Allipade parishes.

Shri Vaidyanatha Daivastana Iranthabettu 
Shri Vaidyanatha temple, Iranthabettu: A Hindu temple, with more than 1000 years of history. In recent years this temple has got newly built Sanctuary. People from this village had put great efforts towards building this temple.

Sri Shanmukha Subramanya Temple 
Location: Situated near the river banks of Netravathi.

Economy 
 Agriculture is the main occupation of the people around this village, people also doing farming of Areca palm & coconut Palm  Along with rubber farming.

Transport
Local  services  buses ply from B.C road bus stand  which is the main transport for the locals. Auto rickshaw service available from Panemangalore  city.

Places to See 

Vented Dam Shamboor
The dam is built up by MRPL (Mangalore Refinery and Petrochemicals Limited)
A M R Power Project Shamboor
 Hydel power plant

Villages in Dakshina Kannada district